Konkan, Burkina Faso is a village in the Sidéradougou Department of Comoé Province in south-western Burkina Faso. The village has a population of 223.

References

Populated places in the Cascades Region
Comoé Province